The 1993 Friuli-Venezia Giulia regional election took place on 6 June 1993.

Events
The Northern League, at its first appearance in a regional election, became the largest party with 26.7%, while Christian Democracy, which had governed the Region since 1964, came second with 22.3%. The combined score of all regionalist parties was 37.5%.

Between 1993 and 1998 the Region was quinte instable politically and was governed by a succession of governments led both my members of the Northern League (Pietro Fontanini, Alessandra Guerra and Sergio Cecotti) and by centre-left figures (Renzo Travanut and Giancarlo Cruder).

Results
Source: Istituto Cattaneo

References

Elections in Friuli-Venezia Giulia
1993 elections in Italy
June 1993 events in Europe